Microseris acuminata is a species of flowering plant in the family Asteraceae known by the common name Sierra foothill silverpuffs. It is native to the Central Valley of California and the mountain ranges, including the Sierra Nevada, surrounding it. There is a disjunct occurrence in Jackson County, Oregon. The plant grows in grassy habitat, woodlands, and sometimes the edges of vernal pools.

Description
It is an annual herb growing 5 to 35 centimeters tall from a basal rosette of erect leaves; there is no true stem. Each leaf is up to 20 centimeters long and has edges lined in comblike narrow lobes. The inflorescence is borne on an erect, curving, or drooping peduncle. The flower head contains up to 50 flat ray florets. The distinctive fruit is an achene with a brown, hairless body about half a centimeter long. At the tip of the body is a large pappus made up of five long, jointed scales each up to a centimeter in length and lined with bristles and hairs.

References

External links
 Calflora Database: Microseris acuminata'' (Sierra foothill silverpuffs, Needle microseriss)
Jepson Manual eFlora (TJM2) treatment of Microseris acuminata
USDA Plants Profile
UC Photos gallery — Microseris acuminata

acuminata
Flora of California
Flora of Oregon
Flora of the Sierra Nevada (United States)
Natural history of the California chaparral and woodlands
Natural history of the California Coast Ranges
Natural history of the Central Valley (California)
Taxa named by Edward Lee Greene
Flora without expected TNC conservation status